The Sonny Side of Chér is the second studio album by American singer-actress Cher, released on March 28, 1966, by Imperial, as her second album, Cher again collaborated with Sonny Bono and Harold Battiste. The album is by-and-large a covers album and contains two songs written by Bono. The title of the album is a pun on the name of Cher's first husband Sonny Bono. Cher's second successful album of the sixties, it was released on CD in 1992 by EMI together with Cher's first album as a 2fer. In 1995 EMI re-released this 2fer with the album Chér.  The last version of the album was released in 2005 only in UK by BGO Records. These editions feature a different track order than the original LP.

Background and production
After the success of her previous album, Cher quickly recorded another album. The Sonny Side of Chér was in the chart with the second studio album of Sonny & Cher, The Wondrous World of Sonny & Cher. The album follows the same formula of the previous album with rearranged covers and new songs written by Bono. The Sonny Side of Chér was overall less successful than the previous release, but produced bigger hits than the first album did. It contains Cher's first solo Top Ten hit, the Bono-penned song "Bang Bang (My Baby Shot Me Down)". With "Bang Bang", Cher was definitively settled in the American pop culture. The album also had two songs with French influence, "A Young Girl" and "Our Day Will Come" and Edith Piaf's famous "Milord".

Like her previous album All I Really Want to Do, Cher covered one song written and performed by Bob Dylan, "Like a Rolling Stone".
The album also included Tom Jones' "It's Not Unusual", the popular song "Our Day Will Come" and "The Girl from Ipanema". Other covers are "A Young Girl" and "Ol' Man River" (which shows the huge vocal power Cher already had on this early album).

Singles
Two singles were released from this album; both were written by Bono.
"Where Do You Go", the album's first single release, was a Dylan-mimic and reached number 25 in the Billboard Hot 100 and number 17 on the Canadian Singles Chart. The second single released was Cher's most successful song of the sixties, "Bang Bang (My Baby Shot Me Down)", which peaked in the US at No. 2 and which was also a hit in the UK Singles Chart at No. 3. The song was covered by Bono in the Sonny & Cher live album Live in Las Vegas Vol. 2, and was later re-recorded for the 1987 studio album Cher.

Critical reception

The album received mixed reviews from music critics. Tim Sendra from AllMusic website wrote that even though the album uses "the folk-rock formula that had made her previous album such a delight" The Sonny Side of Cher is "nothing more than a chuckle-inducing curiosity, just the kind of silly record casual listeners might expect from the duo." He praised the cover songs "Like a Rolling Stone" by Bob Dylan, "Elusive Butterfly" and "Come to Your Window" by Bob Lind but criticized the folk-rock sound in pop tunes like  "It's Not Unusual," "Our Day Will Come," and "The Girl from Ipanema." He concluded that "the album is doomed by its lack of heart and inability to rise above the formulaic." A Billboard magazine review called the album "well produced", "well performed" and a "fast-moving item".

Commercial performance
The Sonny Side of Chér peaked at number 26 on the Billboard 200. The album entered into the chart while The Wondrous World of Sonny & Cher was also charting.
The album also entered in the UK Albums Chart and debuted at number 28 in May, and reached its highest position at number eleven, three weeks later.
The album remained in the chart for eleven weeks and exited in July. The Sonny Side of Chér was also Cher's last album that entered in the UK Albums chart until her 1987 comeback album Cher (released by Geffen). The Sonny Side of Chér also entered in the Norway albums chart and peaked at No. 17.

Track listing

Personnel
Cher - lead vocals
Sonny Bono - record producer
Harold Battiste - musical arranger
Larry Levine - sound engineer
Stan Ross - sound engineer
Woody Woodward - art direction
No musicians were credited, only: "A very special thanks to some of the greatest musicians in Hollywood for their part in making this album possible"

Charts

Weekly charts

Year-end charts

References

1966 albums
Cher albums
Albums arranged by Harold Battiste
Albums produced by Sonny Bono
Liberty Records albums
EMI Records albums
Imperial Records albums
Albums recorded at Gold Star Studios
Articles containing video clips